Professor David Norman (born 1949) is a British Chartered Physicist and ornithologist, he has lived in Cheshire since 1978.

Physics

Professor Norman is a former Director of Synchrotron Radiation, Council for the Central Laboratory of the Research Councils, Daresbury Laboratory. He was a visiting Professor in Surface Science at the University of Liverpool.

Ornithology 

Since 2005 he has been an independent member of the United Kingdom's Rare Breeding Birds Panel and he is a member of the RSPB Council, and Chairman of the Merseyside Ringing Group. He is an honorary research associate of the Carnegie Museum of Natural History, spending up to a month each year at their Powdermill Nature Reserve.

He served on the council of English Nature from 1996 to 2002 (and in September 2000 became interim acting chairman for six months). He has been chairman of the Cheshire Wildlife Trust and a member of the Editorial Board for Ornithology's journal Ringing & Migration. He was the founder chairman of the Mersey Estuary Conservation Group and Research Committee of the Liverpool Bay Wader Study Group.

In 2002 he was awarded the British Trust for Ornithology's Bernard Tucker Medal "for his outstanding scientific contributions in surveying, nest-recording and ringing birds".

Bibliography
 
 BTO Migration Atlas (texts on common tern, wood warbler and common chaffinch)
 Birds in Cheshire and Wirral, Liverpool University Press, 2008 
On behalf of the Cheshire and Wirral Ornithological Society

Papers 
Various, on  waders on the Mersey Estuary, fieldfares, common terns, little terns, wood warblers, common firecrests and bramblings

References

External links 
 David Norman's website
 Cheshire and Wirral Bird Atlas website by David Norman
 Stars including Mark Radcliffe come out for Runcorn bird expert’s book - includes picture of Norman.

1950 births
English nature writers
English ornithologists
English physicists
People from Cheshire
Living people
Academics of the University of Liverpool